Bangladesh is  a country in South Asia.

Bangladesh or Bangla Desh may also refer to:

"Bangla Desh" (song), a 1971 song by George Harrison
Bangladeš, a Roma settlement in Novi Sad, Serbia
Bangladesh: A Legacy of Blood, a 1986 book by Anthony Mascarenhas

See also
Little Bangladesh (disambiguation)
Bengal, the historic socio-cultural region in South Asia